The Ambrosini Sagittario was an Italian aerodynamic research aircraft based on the manufacturer's S.7.

Development
New swept wings and tail surfaces of wooden construction were fitted to the S.7 fuselage. The wing leading edge was swept at 45 degrees. At first, the S.7's piston engine was retained and the aircraft was known as the Ambrosini S.7 Freccia (Arrow).

After several test flights in this configuration (the first on 5 January 1953), the piston engine was removed and replaced with a Turbomeca Marboré turbojet of 3.7 kN (840 lbf) thrust, and the aircraft renamed the Sagittario. The engine air inlet was in the extreme nose, and the exhaust was routed out the bottom of the fuselage, under the cockpit. The tail wheel undercarriage was retained, so special shielding was added to protect the tail wheel from the engine exhaust.

The later Aerfer Sagittario 2 differed in having a tricycle undercarriage and fully transparent cockpit glazing.

Operators

Italian Air Force  operated the only aircraft for evaluation test

Specifications

See also

References

Bibliography

 
 Flight, 24 April 1953, pp. 508–509

Sagittario
1950s Italian experimental aircraft
Single-engined jet aircraft
Low-wing aircraft
Aircraft first flown in 1953